Knape is a Swedish surname. Notable people with the surname include:

Anders Knape (born 1955), Swedish politician
Bo Knape (born 1949), Swedish Olympic sailor
Ulrika Knape (born 1955), Swedish Olympic diver

Swedish-language surnames